Jessie Mabel Pritchard Dearmer (née White; 22 March 1872 – 15 July 1915) was an English novelist, dramatist and children's book author/illustrator. She was a committed pacifist who died while caring for the war wounded in Serbia.

Early life 
Born Jessie Mabel Pritchard White, the daughter of surgeon-major William White and Selina Taylor Pritchard, she was educated in London and was trained by W. G. Wills. She entered Hubert von Herkomer's art school in 1891, but left the following year to marry the socialist liturgist priest Percy Dearmer.

Writing career

In 1896 she began contributing illustrations to The Yellow Book, The Savoy and The Studio. She notable created the cover for the Yellow Book's issue number nine. She soon after turned to children's book illustration. Dearmer created artwork for Wymps, and Other Fairy Tales and All the Way to Fairyland by Evelyn Sharp and The Story of the Seven Young Goslings by Laurence Housman (1899). She also illustrated several self-written titles, Round-about Rhymes (1898), The Book of Penny Toys (1899), and The Noah’s Ark Geography (1900).

From 1902 Dearmer began writing for adults, beginning with The Noisy Years and its 1906 sequel Brownjohn’s. Her autobiography The Difficult Way was published in 1905, and other titles include a historical romance The Orangery: A Comedy of Tears (1904), The Alien Sisters (1908), and Gervase 1909. A keen dramatist, in 1911 she founded the Morality Play Society, which performed productions of her plays The Soul of the World and The Dreamer.

Though a committed pacifist, Dearmer accompanied her husband when he volunteered as a chaplain to the British Red Cross. Joining the Third Serbian Relief Unit as a nursing orderly she left for Serbia in April 1915, but contracted enteric fever (typhoid) in June, and died of pneumonia on 15 July. Her letters were posthumously published as Letters from a field hospital. With a memoir of the author by Stephen Gwynn.

Three months after her death, her younger son Christopher died in the Gallipoli Campaign. His elder brother Geoffrey Dearmer survived to the age of 103.

Works 

Roundabout Rhymes (1898)
The Book of Penny Toys (1899)
Noah's Ark Geography (1900), also known as The Cockyolly Bird and A Noah’s Ark Geography. A True Account of the Travels and Adventures of Kit, Jum-Jum and the Cockyolly Bird, faithfully set forth and pictured by Mabel Dearmer. 
The Noisy Years (1903)

The Difficult Way (1905)
Brownjohn's (1906)
A Child's Life of Christ (1907)
The Alien Sisters (1908) 
 
Gervase (1909)
Nan Pilgrim (1909)
The Soul of the World: A Mystery Play (1911)
The Dreamer: A Poetic Drama (1912)
The Cockyolly Bird (1913: produced in London, with music and dance)
 with Martin Shaw
The Cockyolly Bird: A Book of the Play (1914)

References

External links

 Mabel Dearmer by Richard Mammana
 
 Article on Mabel Dearmer from 'The Yellow Nineties Online'
 'Mabel Dearmer in Serbia' blog entry from the British Library

1872 births
1915 deaths
19th-century illustrators of fairy tales
20th-century British women writers
20th-century English novelists
British illustrators
British women illustrators
British women children's writers
British children's book illustrators
British women in World War I
English children's writers
English socialists